Gilmar Dal Pozzo (born 1 September 1969) is a Brazilian professional football coach and former player who played as a goalkeeper. He is the current head coach of Ituano.

Playing career
Born in Quilombo, Santa Catarina. represented Caxias, Veranópolis, Londrina, Marítimo, Goiás, Avaí, Santa Cruz and Ulbra, retiring with the latter in 2007.

But as coach that won greater emphasis on controlling the emerging Chapecoense, so little time for the Série A. to be vice-champions in the Série B leaving the club in May 2014, after a bad start in Série A. but was little unemployment, for which in a short the Criciúma. in the year 2015, had a brief passage by ABC being in September of the same assuming the Náutico.

On 27 April 2016, he was fired by the management of Náutico because of bad results that were welcomed at decisive moments for the club. But months later, he was hired to be the new coach of Paysandu.

Career statistics
(Correct )

List of goals scored

Following, is the list with the goals scored by Gilmar:

Honors

Club honours 
Caxias
 Campeonato Gaúcho: 2000

Titles as a manager 
 Pelotas
 Copa FGF: 2008

 Náutico
 Campeonato Brasileiro Série C: 2019

External links

External links
Futebol de Goyaz profile 

1969 births
Living people
Brazilian footballers
Sportspeople from Santa Catarina (state)
Association football goalkeepers
Sociedade Esportiva e Recreativa Caxias do Sul players
Veranópolis Esporte Clube Recreativo e Cultural players
Londrina Esporte Clube players
C.S. Marítimo players
Goiás Esporte Clube players
Avaí FC players
Santa Cruz Futebol Clube players
Canoas Sport Club players
Brazilian football managers
Campeonato Brasileiro Série A players
Campeonato Brasileiro Série B players
Primeira Liga players
Expatriate footballers in Portugal
Brazilian expatriate footballers
Campeonato Brasileiro Série A managers
Campeonato Brasileiro Série B managers
Campeonato Brasileiro Série C managers
Veranópolis Esporte Clube Recreativo e Cultural managers
Esporte Clube Pelotas managers
Esporte Clube Novo Hamburgo managers
Associação Chapecoense de Futebol managers
Criciúma Esporte Clube managers
ABC Futebol Clube managers
Clube Náutico Capibaribe managers
Paysandu Sport Club managers
Ceará Sporting Club managers
Esporte Clube Juventude managers
Grêmio Esportivo Brasil managers
Paraná Clube managers
Joinville Esporte Clube managers
Sport Club do Recife managers
Ituano FC managers